Brendon de Jonge (born 18 July 1980) is a professional golfer from Zimbabwe. He currently plays on the PGA Tour. He played collegiate golf at Virginia Tech.

Virginia Tech career
De Jonge was a two-time All-America selection by the Golf Coaches of America Association (2002, 2003). He was also Virginia collegiate player of the year for those two seasons. He was elected to the Virginia Tech Sports Hall of Fame in 2014.

Professional career
De Jonge played on the Nationwide Tour from 2004 to 2006 and 2008.  He earned his 2007 PGA Tour card at Q-school. He finished 155th on the money list in 2007, losing his tour card. In 2008 he finished second on the Nationwide Tour money list and earned his 2009 PGA Tour card. He did this by winning the Xerox Classic and recording a runner up finish and three third place finishes. He won the 2008 Nationwide Tour Player of the Year.

De Jonge finished 139th on the money list in 2009, which initially gave him conditional status for 2010. He earned a full tour card through PGA Tour Qualifying School. In 2010 De Jonge had his most successful year to date, with 7 top ten finishes taking him to 34th on the money list.

Amateur wins (2)
1998 David Leadbetter Junior Invitational
1999 Zimbabwe Amateur

Professional wins (1)

Nationwide Tour wins (1)

Playoff record
PGA Tour playoff record (0–1)

Results in major championships

CUT = missed the half-way cut
"T" = tied

Summary

Results in The Players Championship

CUT = missed the halfway cut
"T" indicates a tie for a place

Results in World Golf Championships

"T" = Tied

Team appearances
Amateur
Eisenhower Trophy (representing Zimbabwe): 2000

Professional
World Cup (representing Zimbabwe): 2011, 2013
Presidents Cup (representing the International team): 2013

See also
2006 PGA Tour Qualifying School graduates
2008 Nationwide Tour graduates
2009 PGA Tour Qualifying School graduates

References

External links

Zimbabwean male golfers
Virginia Tech Hokies men's golfers
PGA Tour golfers
Korn Ferry Tour graduates
White Zimbabwean sportspeople
Zimbabwean people of Dutch descent
Zimbabwean expatriates in the United States
Sportspeople from Harare
1980 births
Living people